George William Gent (14 October 1852 – 8 May 1898) was a nineteenth century Anglican priest and teacher.

Gent was educated at Rossall and then at University College, Oxford, where he took a first in Greats. He taught classics at Llandovery College for four years; during that time he was ordained by Basil Jones in 1877. After curacies in Llandovery and Westminster he was a Tutor at Keble College, Oxford, from 1882 to 1887. He was Principal of St Mark's College, Chelsea from 1887 to 1897; and then of St David's College, Lampeter from then until his death.

References

Principals of St David's College
1852 births
1898 deaths
Alumni of University College, Oxford
People associated with Plymouth Marjon University